Schoolhouse Rock! Rocks is a tribute album based on the American animated TV series, Schoolhouse Rock! It was released by Atlantic/Lava Records in 1996 and contains 15 tracks, the original "Schoolhouse Rocky" theme and covers of 14 songs from the series performed by popular music artists. There was also a promo-only 7" single distributed to promote this album featuring the Man or Astro-man? track and the Pavement track. This single was pressed on yellow vinyl. "Three Is a Magic Number" was one of the last recordings made by Blind Melon's Shannon Hoon, who died of a drug overdose in October 1995.

A portion of the sales of the album went to the Children's Defense Fund.

Reception
Reception to Schoolhouse Rock! Rocks was generally very positive, with Entertainment Weekly rating it a B+ and commenting on the surprising charm and high-quality contributions by the popular young artists.

Track listing
 "Schoolhouse Rocky" by Bob Dorough and Friends – 0:13
 "I'm Just a Bill" by Deluxx Folk Implosion – 3:26
 "Three Is a Magic Number" by Blind Melon – 3:14
 "Conjunction Junction" by Better Than Ezra – 3:44
 "Electricity, Electricity!" by Goodness – 3:21
 "No More Kings" by Pavement – 4:22
 "The Shot Heard 'Round the World" by Ween – 3:09
 "My Hero, Zero" by The Lemonheads – 3:06
 "The Energy Blues" by Biz Markie – 3:10
 "Little Twelvetoes" by Chavez – 3:56
 "Verb: That's What's Happening" by Moby – 4:29
 "Interplanet Janet" by Man or Astro-man? – 2:46
 "Lolly, Lolly, Lolly, Get Your Adverbs Here" by Buffalo Tom – 2:13
 "Unpack Your Adjectives" by Daniel Johnston – 3:05
 "The Tale of Mr. Morton" by Skee-Lo – 4:05

Single tracks
Side A
"No More Kings" by Pavement – 4:22
Side B
"Interplanet Janet" by Man or Astro-man? – 2:46

Chart performance
The album charted at number 70 on the Billboard 200 in 1996.

References

Television animation soundtracks
Tribute albums
1996 compilation albums
1996 EPs
Atlantic Records compilation albums
Atlantic Records EPs
Alternative rock compilation albums
Alternative rock EPs
Schoolhouse Rock!